The 2014 United States Senate election in Arkansas was held on November 4, 2014, to elect a member of the United States Senate to represent the state of Arkansas, concurrently with the election of the Governor of Arkansas, as well as other elections to the United States Senate in other states and elections to the United States House of Representatives and various state and local elections.

Incumbent Democratic Senator Mark Pryor ran for re-election to a third term in office. He was unopposed in the Democratic primary; U.S. Representative Tom Cotton was also unopposed for the Republican nomination. While the race was initially expected to be close, Cotton prevailed by a margin of 56.5%-39.4%. The Associated Press called the race for Cotton immediately after the polls closed. This marked the first time since Reconstruction that Republicans held both Senate seats in Arkansas, and the Arkansas congressional delegation was entirely Republican. Elected at age 37, Cotton surpassed Connecticut's Chris Murphy as the youngest incumbent senator at that time and was until the seating of Missouri’s Josh Hawley at the opening of the 116th United States Congress.

Background 
Arkansas Attorney General Mark Pryor was first elected to the Senate in 2002, defeating first-term Republican incumbent Tim Hutchinson. He was re-elected with 80% of the vote in 2008 as he was unopposed by a Republican candidate. He faced competition only from Green Party nominee Rebekah Kennedy, who won the largest share of the vote of any Green Party candidate in a Senate race in history. Of the 88 previous occasions when an incumbent senator was re-elected without major party opposition and then went on to contest the following general election, all 88 were successfully re-elected.

Heading into the 2014 Cotton vs. Pryor matchup, only 17 House freshmen had been elected to the U.S. Senate over the last century, and just two in the last 40 years. In the 2014 cycle, Cotton and Montana's Steve Daines became the 18th and 19th freshmen to win U.S. Senate races since 1914.

The election was originally thought to be extremely close- a claim backed up by polling, but Tom Cotton ended up winning in a landslide against the incumbent, by nearly 17 points.

Democratic primary 
Pryor was unopposed for the Democratic nomination.

Candidates

Declared 
 Mark Pryor, incumbent U.S. Senator

Declined 
 Bobby Tullis, former state representative

Republican primary 
Cotton was unopposed for the Republican nomination.

Candidates

Declared 
 Tom Cotton, U.S. Representative

Declined 
 Rick Crawford, U.S. Representative
 Mark Darr, Lieutenant Governor of Arkansas
 Timothy Griffin, U.S. Representative
 Steve Womack, U.S. Representative

Third parties

Candidates

Declared 
 Nathan LaFrance (Libertarian), energy executive
 Mark Swaney (Green), mechanical engineer and nominee for the state house in 2010

General election

Endorsements

Fundraising

Debates 
 Complete video of debate, October 13, 2014

Predictions

Polling

Results

See also 

 2014 Arkansas gubernatorial election
 2014 United States House of Representatives elections in Arkansas
 2014 United States Senate elections
 2014 United States elections

References

External links 
 U.S. Senate elections in Arkansas, 2014 at Ballotpedia
 Campaign contributions at OpenSecrets
 Arkansas Senate debate excerpts, OnTheIssues.org

Campaign websites (Archived)
 Mark Pryor (D) for U.S. Senate
 Tom Cotton (R) for U.S. Senate
 Nathan LaFrance (L) for U.S. Senate
 Mark Swaney (G) for U.S. Senate

2014
Arkansas
United States Senate